Gary Wayne Baxter (born November 24, 1978) is a former American football cornerback. He was drafted by the Baltimore Ravens in the second round of the 2001 National Football League draft. He played college football at Baylor.

College career
Baxter played college football at Baylor where he played in 41 games making 202 tackles and six interceptions. He would return to the college in 2003 and graduated with a degree in speech communications.

Professional career

Baltimore Ravens
Baxter was drafted out of Baylor University in the second round, with the 62nd overall pick of the 2001 NFL Draft by the Baltimore Ravens. After playing in a situational and reserve role for Baltimore during his rookie season, Baxter started 46 games over the next three years (eight at safety, 38 at cornerback).  During this time, he became a solid member of one of the NFL's best defenses.  For his career, he recorded six interceptions, 36 passes defended, three sacks, 253 tackles, and two forced fumbles.

Baxter is perhaps best known for a play made in a 2004 game against the Pittsburgh Steelers, in which he inadvertently caused an injury to the Steelers' starting quarterback, Tommy Maddox, forcing their rookie quarterback Ben Roethlisberger into action. Roethlisberger was unable to salvage the win and the Ravens won the game 30-13.

Cleveland Browns
On March 2, 2005, Baxter signed a six-year, $30 million free agent contract with the Browns that included a $10.5 million signing bonus. His career with the Browns was injury-plagued, including a torn pectoral muscle that caused him to miss 11 games during the 2005 season.

On October 22, 2006, Baxter's career was dealt a major blow when he tore the patella tendons in both knees during a game against the Denver Broncos. He was the first NFL player to suffer such an injury in 13 years.

On July 30, 2007, Baxter returned to practice, although in limited capacity.  The recovery, which surprised and confounded many doctors close to Baxter, marked the first time that a player had returned to the field of play after such a devastating injury. On October 23, 2007, the Browns placed Baxter on injured reserve.

On August 9, 2008, he was released by the Browns.

Statistics

1Statistics unavailable

References

1978 births
Living people
American football cornerbacks
American football safeties
Baltimore Ravens players
Baylor Bears football players
Cleveland Browns players
Sportspeople from Tyler, Texas
Players of American football from Texas
Ed Block Courage Award recipients